Phil Hoadley (born 6 January 1952) is an English former footballer born in Battersea, London, who made more than 400 appearances in the Football League playing as a central defender for Crystal Palace, Orient and Norwich City.

Playing career
Hoadley began his career as an apprentice with Crystal Palace. He made his first-team debut on 27 April 1968, as a substitute in the Second Division match away to Bolton Wanderers. At 16 years 112 days, he became Palace's then youngest player. After appearing in 88 matches in all competitions for Crystal Palace, he joined Orient, in September 1971, whom he captained to the semi-finals of the 1977–78 FA Cup. Having played nearly 300 games for Orient, his transfer to Norwich City in 1978 was the first move under freedom of contract legislation with a tribunal setting his value at £110,000. After three years with Norwich he moved to play in Hong Kong football in February 1982, but was forced to retire from professional football following a knee injury. He returned to England and became a publican.

Later career
Following his professional football career Hoadley remained involved with amateur football in the Norfolk area and worked in a variety of jobs before returning to Norwich City in the 1990s as football in the community officer. , he was landlord of a community-run public house in his local village.

References

External links
 Stats and photo at Sporting Heroes
 League stats at Neil Brown's site
 Phil Hoadley at holmesdale.net

1952 births
Living people
Footballers from Battersea
English footballers
Association football central defenders
Crystal Palace F.C. players
Leyton Orient F.C. players
Norwich City F.C. players
English Football League players